The 1910–11 Niagara Purple Eagles men's basketball team represented Niagara University during the 1910–11 NCAA college men's basketball season. The head coach was Alfred Heerdt, coaching his first season with the Purple Eagles.

Schedule

|-

References

Niagara Purple Eagles men's basketball seasons
Niagara
Niagara Purple Eagles men's basketball
Niagara Purple Eagles men's basketball